The Central British Fund for World Jewish Relief, which operates under the name World Jewish Relief, is a British Jewish charitable organisation and is the main Jewish overseas aid organisation in the United Kingdom. World Jewish Relief was formed in 1933 as a support group to German Jews under Nazi rule and played a major role in organising the Kindertransport which rescued around 10,000 German and Austrian children from Nazi Europe. After the war, the organisation brought 732 child Holocaust survivors to Britain; the first 300 are known as The Windermere Children and collectively they are known as The Boys.  Currently, World Jewish Relief functions as one of Britain's leading development organizations, working with Jewish and non-Jewish communities alike. World Jewish Relief operates programmes mainly in the former Soviet Union but also in Eastern Europe, Africa, and Asia.

Founding and beginning operations
World Jewish Relief was originally called the Central British Fund for German Jewry (CBF) and was founded in 1933.  CBF was founded following a meeting of UK Jewish community leaders with Members of Parliament. The meeting was the initiative of Neville Laski and Leonard Montefiore, president of the Anglo-Jewish Association.  The pair were co-chairmen of the Joint Foreign Committee, which united the efforts of the Board of Deputies and the Anglo-Jewish Association. Also involved was Otto Schiff, a German Jew from a prominent family (notably his uncle, the philanthropist Jacob Schiff) who had moved to the UK in 1896 and had been active in aiding refugees and migrants for decades, having been awarded an OBE for his efforts to aid Belgians during the First World War.

Founding members included Simon Marks, chairman and managing director of Marks & Spencer, Sir Robert Waley Cohen, managing director of Shell Oil, Lionel and Anthony de Rothschild, managing partners of N M Rothschild & Sons, and Dr Chaim Weizmann, who would later become the first President of Israel. Another leading member, Sir Osmond d'Avigdor-Goldsmid, felt that through the CBF, ‘Jews of every shade of belief and political thought have united in their efforts to assist German Jewry’. Originally intended to provide support for German Jews who were immigrating to the British Mandate of Palestine, CBF originally funded projects such at Hebrew University, the Technion, and the Maccabi World Union so that these organisations could provide immigrants with the skills and experience needed to become functional members of society in Palestine.

By the time of the launch of CBF's initial appeal in The Jewish Chronicle on 26 May 1933, £61,900 had been raised by 42 donors. By the end of 1933, almost £250,000 had been raised. The 1934 appeal raised £176,000.

Due to funding problems, CBF increasingly turned its efforts away from Palestine and towards Britain. By 1935, CBF and the Jewish Refugees Committee (JRC) were funding a programme that placed Jewish scholars in British universities willing to take on faculty members and graduate students. The two programmes placed more than 200 refugees at universities, including Ernst Chain, whose subsequent work on penicillin earned him a Nobel Prize. In 1936, Robert Waley Cohen and the other CBF leadership were angered at the placement of Youth Aliyah emigrants into non-religious environments in Palestine.

CBF coordinated with the American Jewish Joint Distribution Committee (JDC) in 1936 to create the Council for German Jewry, which carried out much of the pre-war operations to emigrate German Jews.  The two organisations aimed to raise £3m that would resettle 66,000 German Jews.

Resulting from the German-Austrian Anschluss in 1938, thousands of new refugees in Austria looked to emigrate. Due to the volume of need for refugees, the Council for German Jewry, represented by Norman Bentwich, attended the Évian Conference in France to push world leaders for less restrictive immigration policies, but they were largely ignored.  The advent of Kristallnacht later in that year exacerbated the refugee crisis, leaving the JDC overwhelmed in both financial and human resource capacity. The Council for German Jewry was eventually able to persuade the UK Home Office to admit Jews regardless of financial backing, and consequently 68,000 Jews registered before the start of war. For its part, CBF worked with the NGO Save the Children to establish the Inter-Aid Committee, which helped 471 Jewish and Christian children go to boarding schools in Britain.

Kindertransport

In November 1938, Jewish leaders met with British Prime Minister Neville Chamberlain to advocate for allowing German Jewish children to immigrate to the British Mandate of Palestine. This led the subject of children's immigration to the United Kingdom n to be discussed in the next Cabinet meeting, and the UK changed its policy to allow for admittance of Jewish children with largely no paperwork.  Having secured government support, CBF started the Kindertransport effort by establishing the Movement for Care of Children from Germany; together with the Baldwin Fund (headed by ex-Prime Minister Stanley Baldwin) the Movement raised £545,000 (£28.8 million in 2013 GBP) for Kindertransport. The Movement also identified thousands of Jewish and non-Jewish families from across Britain to host Jewish children during the war years. Additionally, it set up unused summer camps on the south coast of England to house refugees waiting for homes, and coordinated with Dutch organisations to transport children from Germany to the UK. Their efforts were aided by Gertruida Wijsmuller-Meijer, a member of the Netherlands Children's Refugee Committee, who met with eventual Final Solution administrator Adolf Eichmann and persuaded him to permit unaccompanied children to go to Britain. By the outbreak of war, the Movement had evacuated 9,354 children from Germany, 90% of them Jewish.

Activities during World War II
Though evacuation attempts halted with the outbreak of war, CBF continued to support children who had already been evacuated and started new projects. CBF ensured that children were being educated in Jewish contexts, and together with the Movement, they took pains to ensure that every child could get religious education in the religion of her parents. After the war, CBF helped refugees to file claims to recover their families' property.  Additionally, CBF and the Council for German Jewry leased a property with two campsites for £350 a year in 1939, renovating them within six months and opening up a camp for young German men at risk of deportation, the Kitchener Camp at Richborough. Over 3,500 men and hundreds of their wives were in residence when war broke out, many of whom would have surely been murdered in the Holocaust. The camp was disbanded by 1940 as many of the men enlisted, fighting for Britain. The Richborough men ended up in the British company that was evacuated from Dunkirk in 1940.

Post-war years
CBF set up and financed the Jewish Committee for Relief Abroad to help administer aid and support to Jewish survivors of Nazi-occupied areas, which was especially instrumental in the liberation of the Bergen-Belsen concentration camp. In 1947, Movement children were granted British citizenship, and CBF helped file claims to recover refugees’ families’ property. In addition, CBF supported 732 orphaned child Holocaust survivors in their relocation to Britain after the war, initially to Windermere, and later to 22 hostels around the country. They also set up the Primrose Club, a community centre in Belsize Park to assist their transition to post-war life. Most became British citizens.

Present work
The dissolution of the Soviet Union in 1991 prompted CBF to shift the focus of its aid efforts to support the two million Jews living there. CBF changed its name to World Jewish Relief in 1995 and has since the early 1990s focused on addressing the causes of poverty in the communities in which it works, in addition to meeting immediate needs.  World Jewish Relief integrated with World Jewish Aid in 2007.  World Jewish Relief currently funds three main types of projects: meeting immediate needs of vulnerable communities, securing sustainable livelihoods for those in poverty, and responding to international disasters. Paul Anticoni became Chief Executive in 2006 and Maurice Helfgott was appointed Chair of Trustees on 28 January 2021.
 Meeting immediate needs: World Jewish Relief works with vulnerable communities in the Former Soviet Union (FSU), primarily in Ukraine, Moldova, Belarus, and Georgia, who often depend on meagre state pensions or welfare entitlements. In those areas, the charity funds homecare, medical expenses, food and communal activities for clients. World Jewish Relief also works in communities to repair and renovate cold and insecure homes, offering their residents relief from the harsh winter weather conditions. The charity also works with partners in Ukraine to provide support for socially isolated communities, and it works with partners in Ukraine, Moldova and India to empower people living with disabilities there, with services including job training, specialist therapy, and wheelchair accessibility improvements.
 Sustainable livelihoods: World Jewish Relief launched its Livelihood Development Programme (LDP) in 2009, which currently operates in Moldova and Ukraine. The Moldova LDP works with women from vulnerable communities to provide job training, as well as Romanian language instruction, with the goal of program graduates finding employment and increased income. The Ukraine LDP works with men and women to provide job trainings and establish job centres in local Jewish Community Centres.  World Jewish Relief also works with partners in Rwanda to provide educational and vocational training to orphaned and street children. Since 2016 World Jewish Relief has run its Specialist Training and Employment Programmes for refugees who have come to the UK. Part funded by the EU's Asylum, Migration and Integration Fund, it is now the largest provider of employment support to resettled refugees. The programme won the 2022 Charity Award in the category of Education and Training. In 2022, World Jewish Relief launched climate resilience pilot programmes in Bangladesh, Myanmar and Nepal to build climate-resilient livelihoods in at-risk areas.
 Disaster response: World Jewish Relief leads the British Jewish community's response to international disasters,  recently working in Haiti, Mozambique and countries in East Africa. In Japan, World Jewish Relief worked with Save the Children to establish spaces for displaced children following the 2011 tsunami there. After the 2010 floods in Pakistan, World Jewish Relief worked with partners to provide immediate needs to displaced communities in Bagh District and restore homes that had been damaged or destroyed. World Jewish Relief worked with Merlin following the 2010 Haiti earthquake to provide medical services for those in need, and it worked primarily in Kenya with partners to provide food services for those suffering from the East Africa food crisis. As part of its disaster response work, World Jewish Relief raised over £1 million for the 2015 Refugee Crisis. Since then it has implemented the Specialist Training and Employment Programme (STEP), working in the UK to help resettled refugees gain employment.

References

External links 
Official website

Jewish refugee aid organizations
Jewish organisations based in the United Kingdom
Jewish charities based in the United Kingdom